Anipoli  is a Hasidic dynasty founded by Rebbe Reb Zishe, Rabbi Zusha of Hanipol (died 1800).

Anipoli is the Yiddish name of Hannopil, Ukraine.

Lineage 
The founder of the dynasty, Rabbi Meshulam Zusha of Hanipol or Meshulum Zusil of Anipoli, was an outstanding disciple of Maggid of Mezritch, who was a disciple of the Baal Shem Tov, the founder of Hasidism. He was also the brother of Rebbe Elimelech of Lizhensk.

Rabbi Meshulam Zusha of Hanipol (1718–1800) — settled in Hanipol and Ḥasidim gathered around him; this circle grew after his brother Elimelech's death, when some of the Elimelech's Ḥasidim accepted Zusha as their rebbe.
Menahem Zvi Hirsh, his oldest son, succeeded him in Hanipol.
Israel Abraham (1772–1814), his youngest son, served as ḥasidic rabbi and admor in Chernyostrov. After Israel Abraham's death, his wife led the Ḥasidim for several years.

History

See also
History of the Jews in Poland
History of the Jews in Galicia (Central Europe)
History of the Jews in Ukraine

References 

Hasidic dynasties
Jewish Galician (Eastern Europe) history